The 2021 European Race Walking Team Championships took place on 16 May 2021. The races were held on a 1 km lap around the city park of Poděbrady, Czech Republic. It was the first edition to be held under the new name of European Race Walking Team Championships (from 2021 on).

For the first time European Race Walking Cup also included women's 35 km racewalking event.

Medallists

Race results

Men's 20 km
Individual race

Team race

Women's 20 km
Individual race

Team race

Women's 35 km
Individual race

Team race

Men's 50 km
Individual race

Team race

Participation 
212 athletes from 25 countries registered for competition of which 200 eventually started.

Medal table

References

External links 
 European Race Walking Team Championships Poděbrady 2021 Statistics handbook
 Event website
 Local site
 Live results

European Race Walking Cup
International athletics competitions hosted by the Czech Republic
European Race Walking Cup
Race Walking Cup
European Race Walking Cup
European Race Walking Cup